William McInanny Carr (born 6 January 1950) is a Scottish former footballer, who played in the Football League for Coventry City, Wolverhampton Wanderers and Millwall. During his time with Coventry, Carr played in six full international matches for Scotland. He later played in non-league football for Worcester City, Willenhall Town, Maidstone United, Stafford Rangers and Stourbridge.

Background
Carr was born in Glasgow. He spent part of his formative teenage years in Cambridge, where his family relocated in 1963.

Playing career

Coventry City
The midfielder had joined Coventry in 1967 as an apprentice debuting as a substitute against Arsenal that year. Along with Ernie Hunt and the likes of Neil Martin and Dennis Mortimer he was part of the Coventry side that achieved the club's highest ever league finish – sixth in 1970, meriting a place in the UEFA Europa League the season after. He is famed for the donkey kick goal scored for Coventry City against Everton in October 1970. He took a free kick by gripping the ball between his ankles and flicking it up for Ernie Hunt to volley home. The move gained widespread fame as the match was televised on Match of the Day, and moved the authorities to ban the technique at the end of the season.

Carr struggled with a knee injury (suffered against Liverpool in April 1973), before leaving for £80,000 in March 1975. He scored 37 goals in 292 games in all competitions for the Sky Blues.

Scotland
During his time with Coventry he won 6 caps for Scotland between 1970 and 1972. His international debut came on 18 April 1970 in a 1–0 win in Northern Ireland.

Wolverhampton Wanderers

He joined Wolverhampton Wanderers debuting against Chelsea in the same month, scoring once in a memorable 7–1 victory. He was a first-choice player and helped his new side to win the 1976–77 Football League Second Division and the 1980 Football League Cup Final. He finally left Wolves in Summer 1982 shortly after they were relegated from the top flight. In total, he made 289 appearances for the club, scoring 26 times.

Millwall & non-league

He next joined Millwall. He stayed for only six months at the London club before returning to the Midlands. He had spells at Worcester City, Willenhall Town and Stourbridge in non-League football before calling time on his playing career in 1988.

After football
He became a rep for an engineering supplies firm in the Birmingham area.

Honours 
 Coventry City F.C. Hall of Fame

Wolverhampton Wanderers

Football League Second Division Championship :1976-1977

Football League Cup: 1979-80

References

External links

1950 births
Living people
Footballers from Glasgow
Scottish footballers
Scotland international footballers
English Football League players
Association football midfielders
Wolverhampton Wanderers F.C. players
Coventry City F.C. players
Millwall F.C. players
Scotland under-23 international footballers
Worcester City F.C. players
Willenhall Town F.C. players
Maidstone United F.C. (1897) players
Stafford Rangers F.C. players
Stourbridge F.C. players
Anglo-Scots